Dave Deno (born 1956 or 1957) was named Chief Executive Officer of Bloomin’ Brands and a member of the Board of Directors in March 2019 after serving as the company’s Chief Financial and Administrative Officer.

As CEO, he is responsible for developing and executing the company’s long-term objectives, growth strategies, and initiatives for its portfolio of casual and fine-dining brands, which include Outback Steakhouse, Carrabba's Italian Grill, Bonefish Grill, Fleming's Prime Steakhouse & Wine Bar, and Aussie Grill by Outback. He is the former CEO of Quizno's. Deno has also been the COO of Yum! Brands.
He has also been the CFO of Tricon Global Restaurants, which is now known as Yum! Brands. He received a bachelor's degree in economics and political science at Macalester College and a master's degree in business administration at the University of Michigan. Deno is divorced and has three children.

References

Living people
1950s births
American chief executives of food industry companies
Macalester College alumni
Yum! Brands people
Ross School of Business alumni
American chief financial officers
American chief operating officers